Colorado Wing Civil Air Patrol (CAP) is the highest echelon of CAP in the state of Colorado. Its headquarters are located at Peterson Space Force Base, and the wing is under the command of Col John Rhoades. 

Colorado Wing (COWG) operates in the Rocky Mountain Region for CAP. COWG consists of 30 squadrons in three groups within Colorado. CAP squadrons are of three types: Cadet, Composite and Senior: 1) "Cadet" squadrons consists of basic cadets, with a minimum of three senior members (adults) for supervisory, administrative, and training requirements; 2) "Senior" squadrons consists exclusively of senior members, all over the age of 18; and, 3) "Composite" squadrons consists of both cadets and senior members, conducting both cadet and senior programs.

Structure 
Colorado Wing is the highest echelon of Civil Air Patrol in Colorado, and reports to Rocky Mountain Region CAP, who reports to CAP National Headquarters.  The wing supervises the individual groups and squadrons that comprise the basic operational unit of CAP.  The Colorado Wing headquarters are located at Peterson SFB, Colorado.

Below the Wing level, Colorado is divided into smaller groups. Each group conducts its own training and programs, 

Underneath each group are numerous squadrons. Squadrons are the local level of organization, and squadrons meet weekly to conduct training. There are three types of Civil Air Patrol squadrons:

Cadet squadrons focus primarily on training, leadership development and activities for CAP cadets.
Senior squadrons are dedicated towards allowing senior members to focus on CAP's missions, normally search and rescue activities. 
Composite squadrons offer programs for both cadets and senior members.

Group 1 

Group 1, Unit 167, conducts operations in Northern Colorado, out of Rocky Mountain Metropolitan Airport, Building B8.

Group 2 

Group 2, Unit 169, conducts operations in Western Colorado, from Montrose, out of Montrose Armory.

Group 3 

Group 3, Unit 165, conducts operations in Southern Colorado.

Group 4 

Group 4, Unit 164, conducts operations in the greater Denver area.

Encampment
Cadet encampments, usually a week in length, provide cadets with an intense look at military life. Encampment attendance is a prerequisite for the Gen. Billy Mitchell Award. Senior members may also be awarded the ribbon for providing leadership at CAP encampments.

Colorado Wing's Encampment has been held at the US Air Force Academy, Ft Carson, and Peterson SFB in Colorado Springs, CO.

Emergency services

Ground search and rescue
The Wing operates a ground search and rescue ("GSAR") school on an annual basis, normally held in the Gore Range of the Rocky Mountains, west of Kremmling  To participate, Cadets must be at least 14 years old, hold the rank of at least Cadet Senior Airman, successfully pass a physical fitness test, and have previous participation in cadet summer activities.  Additionally, all participants must have completed basic training in emergency services (offered by the Federal Emergency Management Agency) and be able to hike long distances with a 20-25 pound pack.  Participants spend the entire school (normally, eight days) in a field environment, and are awarded a Ground Team member badge at the successful completion of the school.

Air search and rescue

CAP cadets can qualify to participate in FAA-approved air-search flights as observers with a CAP-certified pilot. Cadets with their pilot-in-command license can qualify as cadet pilots for air-search flights. Training is provided, along with age and license requirements.

Covid-19 response
In April 2020, pilots from Colorado Wing made multiple flights across Colorado, distributing personal protective equipment to medical facilities and first responders across the state, as a part of Colorado's response to the COVID-19 pandemic.

Awards and decorations

Legal protection
Members of Civil Air Patrol who are employed within the borders of Colorado are guaranteed protection from discrimination or firing from their employer based on their membership in Civil Air Patrol. Employers are also legally prohibited from preventing an employee from taking a leave of absence from their employment to respond to emergencies as a part of Civil Air Patrol. These rights are guaranteed under Colorado Revised Statutes § 28-1-103.

See also
Colorado Air National Guard
Colorado State Defense Force

References

External links 
 CoWG.CAP.gov official site

Wings of the Civil Air Patrol
Education in Colorado
Military in Colorado